Francesco Lovrić (born 5 October 1995) is an Austrian professional footballer currently playing for FC Marchfeld.

Club career 
Lovrić joined VfB Stuttgart in 2011 from Austria Wien. He made his debut on 15 February 2014 for VfB Stuttgart II in the 3. Liga against Hallescher FC in a 3-2 away defeat. He played the full game as a center back.

International career 
Lovrić played for Austria at under-16, under-17, under-18 and under-19 level.

References

External links 
 
 Francesco Lovrić at Kicker

1995 births
Living people
Footballers from Vienna
Austrian footballers
Austrian expatriate footballers
Association football midfielders
3. Liga players
Austrian Football Bundesliga players
2. Liga (Austria) players
FK Austria Wien players
VfB Stuttgart II players
SV Mattersburg players
SC Austria Lustenau players
Kickers Offenbach players
A.E. Karaiskakis F.C. players
USV Eschen/Mauren players
Austria youth international footballers
Austrian expatriate sportspeople in Germany
Austrian expatriate sportspeople in Greece
Austrian expatriate sportspeople in Switzerland
Expatriate footballers in Germany
Expatriate footballers in Greece
Expatriate footballers in Switzerland